Carmelo is a given name. Notable people with the name include:

 Carmelo Anthony (born 1984), American basketball player
 Carmelo Antrone Lee (born 1977), Puerto Rican basketball player
 Carmelo Bene (1937–2002), Italian director, actor, philosopher, writer
 Carmelo Bentancur (born 1899), Uruguayan fencer
 Carmelo Bossi (1939–2014), Italian boxer
 Carmelo Bruzzese (born 1949), Italian mob boss
 Carmelo Cedrún (born 1930), Spanish football goalkeeper
 Carmelo Conte (born 1938), Italian lawyer and politician
 Carmelo D'Anzi (born 1956), Italian-American football coach
 Carmelo Di Bella (1921–1992), Italian football player
 Carmelo Giaquinta (born 1930), Argentine bishop
 Carmelo Gómez (born 1962), Spanish actor
 Carmelo González, aka Cien Caras (born 1949), Mexican wrestler
 Carmelo González (born 1983), Spanish football midfielder
 Carmelo Marrero (born 1981), American martial artist
 Carmelo Martínez (born 1960), Puerto Rican baseball player
 Carmelo Micciche (born 1963), French football striker
 Carmelo Mifsud Bonnici (born 1960), Maltese minister and Member of Parliament
 Carmelo Pace (1906–1993), Maltese composer
 Carmelo Torres (1927–2003), Mexican matador and author
 Carmelo Samonà (1926–1990), Italian Hispanist and author
 Carmelo Valencia (born 1984), Colombian football player
 Carmelo Yuste Yuste (born 1984), Spanish footballer

Italian masculine given names
Spanish masculine given names